Paul O. Wennberg is the R. Stanton Avery Professor of Atmospheric Chemistry and Environmental Science and Engineering at the California Institute of Technology (Caltech). He is the director of the Ronald and Maxine Linde Center for Global Environmental Science. He is chair of the Total Carbon Column Observing Network and a founding member of the Orbiting Carbon Observatory project, which created NASA's first spacecraft for analysis of carbon dioxide in the atmosphere. He is also the principal investigator for the Mars Atmospheric Trace Molecule Occultation Spectrometer (MATMOS) to investigate trace gases in Mars's atmosphere.

Wennberg's research focuses on the atmospheric chemistry of planets, including air quality, photochemistry, and the carbon cycle. He designs and builds remote-sensing and in-situ scientific instruments which are used in field investigations supported by the National Science Foundation and NASA.  His scientific instruments have made it possible to measure radicals in the atmosphere at concentrations that could not previously be detected.  He measures atmospheric trace gases, making it possible to accurately describe the exchange of carbon dioxide and other gases between the atmosphere and the land and ocean.  His research has substantially advanced understanding of the atmospheric chemistry of the troposphere and the stratosphere.

Education
Paul Wennberg grew up in Waterbury Center, Vermont.  He received a B.A. from Oberlin College in 1985, and a Ph.D. from Harvard University in 1994. At Harvard, he worked with James G. Anderson, professor of atmospheric chemistry. His doctoral thesis was In Situ Measurements of Stratospheric Hydroxyl and Hydroperoxyl Radicals.

Career
Wennberg joined Caltech in 1998. He was an associate professor of atmospheric chemistry and environmental engineering science from 1998 to 2001, becoming a full professor in 2001. In 2004, he was appointed as the R. Stanton Avery Professor of Atmospheric Chemistry and Environmental Science and Engineering.  Wennberg has been associated with the Ronald and Maxine Linde Center for Global Environmental Science at Caltech since it was established in 2008. He served as the director from 2008 to 2011, acting director from 2012 to 2014 and director from 2014 onwards.

Research
While still at Harvard, Wennberg developed advanced airborne sensors to measure radicals in the atmosphere, in particular the odd-hydrogen 
radicals OH and HO2. The laser-induced fluorescence instrument that he developed was placed in the nose of a  NASA ER-2 aircraft to measure radicals during flight. It has been used to measure radicals in both the troposphere and the stratosphere.

Wennberg's sensor was used in several NASA missions, beginning with the SPADE mission in 1993. SPADE obtained the first simultaneous in situ measurements of OH, HO2, NO, NO2, ClO, and BrO from the lower stratosphere. The data were used to calculate ozone loss rates and showed that HOx dominated stratospheric ozone loss, a result that had not been previously observable. NASA's ASHOE/MAESA mission (1994) took measurements of HOx from latitudes of -70°S to 70°N, reaching nearly from the south pole to the north pole. The STRAT mission (1995–1996) was the first to record measurements of HOx in the upper troposphere, and demonstrated that the concentration of HOx considerably exceeded expected levels.  The POLARIS mission in 1997 obtained measurements all the way to 90° N latitude, the North pole. As of 2004, Wennberg's instrument was modified for in situ measurements of water vapour and its Isotopologue HDO, and became the basis of the Harvard "Hoxotope".

Since his move to Caltech, Wennberg has been deeply involved in two inter-related long-term instrumentation and data-collection projects: the Orbiting Carbon Observatory, and its ground-based counterpart, the Total Carbon Column Observing Network. Goals include better understanding of the carbon cycle, validation of data from space-based instruments, and establishing a standard for ground-based in situ networked data collection.

In 2002, Wennberg was elected chair of the Total Carbon Column Observing Network (TCCON). In 2004, the first TCCON site was established.  The Total Carbon Column Observing Network is a group of about 20 ground-based sites worldwide that host Fourier transform spectrometers. The spectrometers examine near-infrared (NIR) solar absorption spectra and measure atmospheric column abundances of CO2, CH4, CO, N2O and other molecules in terrestrial ecosystems.  Data enables researchers to identify and study local carbon "sources" and "sinks", and by pooling data across the system, to better understand mechanisms of carbon exchange involving the atmosphere, the land, and the ocean. Data from the sites is used to understand carbon dynamics and to validate data from space-based measurements of atmospheric CO2 and CH4. Both terrestrial and atmospheric data are used to study carbon transfer within the atmosphere. Methane emissions from the Aliso Canyon gas leak were detected by TCCON within a day of the start of the leak. "TCCON has pioneered a key element of the ground segment measurements required to provide the evidence base for policy making for the next 100 years."

Wennberg is a founding member of the Orbiting Carbon Observatory and its successor, the Orbiting Carbon Observatory-2.  The first satellite failed to separate from the Orbital Taurus XL rocket used as its launch vehicle on February 24, 2009, and was destroyed during reentry.  The second satellite, a near duplicate, was launched successfully  by NASA on July 2, 2014, using a ULA Delta II 7320-10C rocket.  Spectrometers on the satellite can map the distribution of CO2 particles across the planet by measuring the average amount of CO2 above specific locations.

Wennberg is the principal investigator for the development of the Mars Atmospheric Trace Molecule Occultation Spectrometer (MATMOS), a collaboration between Caltech and the Canadian Space Agency with NASA support. MATMOS will be flown on the ExoMars Trace Gas Orbiter and take spectra of the sunlight through Mars' atmosphere as the spacecraft goes through its orbital sunrise and sunset. MATMOS will be able to measure trace gases in Mars's atmosphere at a concentrations of parts per trillion.

Awards and honors
Wennberg received a Presidential Early Career Award for Scientists and Engineers (PECASE) in 1999 from President Bill Clinton. He was named a MacArthur Foundation Fellow in 2002.

References

Living people
Harvard University alumni
MacArthur Fellows
California Institute of Technology faculty
Atmospheric chemists
Year of birth missing (living people)
20th-century American chemists
21st-century American chemists
Oberlin College alumni
People from Waterbury, Vermont
Scientists from Vermont